Vancouver Whitecaps FC is a Canadian professional soccer team based in Vancouver, British Columbia that competes in Major League Soccer (MLS). The Whitecaps are the 17th team of Major League Soccer and replace the USSF Division 2 team of the same name, which was owned and managed by the same group that operates the MLS team, and which played through the conclusion of that league's 2010 season. The MLS team is the third to share the legacy of the Whitecaps name.

This is a list of franchise records for the Vancouver Whitecaps, which dates from the 2011 to present.

Honours

Domestic competitions 

 Canadian Championship
 Winners (2): 2015, 2022
 Runners-up (5): 2011, 2012, 2013, 2016, 2018

 Minor trophies
 Cascadia Cup
 Winners (3): 2013, 2014, 2016
 Walt Disney World Pro Soccer Classic
 Winners (1): 2012

Key

Player records

Most appearances 

CC = Canadian Championship; CCL = CONCACAF Champions League; Other = Knockout Round of MLS is Back Tournament
Bolded players are currently on the Whitecaps FC roster.

Top goalscorers 

CC = Canadian Championship; CCL = CONCACAF Champions League
Bolded players are currently on the Whitecaps FC roster.

Hat tricks 

 Kekuta Manneh v Seattle Sounders FC October 9, 2013
 Camilo Sanvezzo v Colorado Rapids October 27, 2013
 Cristian Techera v New England Revolution May 26, 2018
 Brian White v San Jose Earthquakes October 2, 2021

Coaching records

List of seasons

MLS Cup Playoffs

By year

By opponent

By venue

International competition

CONCACAF Champions League

By year

By opponent

MLS single season records

Regular season

Team 

 Best result (conference): 2nd in 2015
 Best result (overall): 3rd in 2015
 Most wins by team: 16 in 2015
 Most losses by team: 18 in 2011
 Most points by team: 53 in 2015
 Most goals by team: 54 in 2018
 Fewest goals by team: 35 in 2011, 2012
 Most goals against by team: 67 in 2018
 Fewest goals against by team: 36 in 2015
 Longest win streak: 4 in 2015 and 2021
 Longest unbeaten streak: 10 in 2021
 Longest losing streak: 5 in 2012, 2019, and 2021
 Longest winless streak: 14 in 2011

Players 

 Most goals: Camilo, 22 (2013)
 Most assists: Pedro Morales, 12 (2014)
 Most shots: Camilo, 123 (2013)
 Most shots on goal: Camilo, 55 (2013)

Goalkeepers 

 Most wins: David Ousted, 12 (2014, 2015)
 Most clean sheets: David Ousted, 13 (2014, 2015)
 Most saves: David Ousted, 99 (2015)

See also 

 List of Vancouver Whitecaps FC players

References 

Records
Vancouver Whitecaps FC records and statistics